Rolland John Seltz (January 25, 1924 – October 13, 2022) was an American professional basketball player who played in the National Basketball Association (NBA) during its first year of existence.  He played 34 games for the Anderson Packers during the 1949–50 season.

Early life
Seltz was born in McIntosh, Minnesota, on January 25, 1924.  He attended Humboldt Senior High School in nearby Saint Paul.  He then studied at Hamline University, where he was named an All-American by Converse in 1946.  While in college, he also played minor league baseball for the Duluth Dukes, Jamestown Falcons, Rochester Red Wings, Lynchburg Cardinals and Allentown Cardinals, posting a .266 batting average with 42 home runs and 242 runs batted in in 400 games.  This arrangement attracted controversy during the 1944–45 season, since it was regarded in some quarters as a violation of his amateur status for college basketball.

Professional career
Following his college career, Seltz joined the Anderson Duffey Packers of the National Basketball League (NBL) in 1946.  He played two seasons for the Packers and one for the Waterloo Hawks, averaging 8.1 points per game in 1948–49.  The following season, Seltz re-joined the Packers as the team moved to the new National Basketball Association (formed through a merger of the NBL and the Basketball Association of America).  He made his NBA debut for the franchise on November 3, 1949, scoring 18 points and making four of five free throws against the Tri-Cities Blackhawks.  Seltz averaged 7.8 points per game and 1.9 assists per game during the 1949–50 season.

While playing professional basketball, Seltz continued playing baseball for Excelsior of the Minnesota Valley League.  He was part of the team that won the Class-A championship in 1949, and was honored as the tournament's most valuable player after batting .643 and committing no errors in 27 chances.  He also served as a player–manager that year.  

Seltz was inducted into Hamline's Athletic Hall of Fame in 1970.  He was also honored in his high school's hall of fame.

Personal life
Seltz's first marriage was to Florence Elliott.  After they divorced, he married Muriel.  They remained married for 45 years until his death.  They raised 11 children together, all from their respective previous marriages.  After retiring from professional basketball, he became the owner of Seltz Insurance Agency.

Seltz died on October 13, 2022, at the age of 98.

References

Specific

Bibliography

External links
NBL statistics
Minor League baseball statistics

1924 births
2022 deaths
All-American college men's basketball players
Allentown Cardinals players
American men's basketball players
Anderson Packers players
Baseball players from Saint Paul, Minnesota
Basketball players from Saint Paul, Minnesota
Duluth Dukes players
Forwards (basketball)
Guards (basketball)
Hamline Pipers men's basketball players
Jamestown Falcons players
Lynchburg Cardinals players
People from Polk County, Minnesota
Rochester Red Wings players
Waterloo Hawks players